Hiroaki Sato may refer to:

, Japanese fighter and wrestler with ring name Hikaru Sato
, Japanese figure skater
, Japanese footballer
, Japanese poet and translator
Hiroaki Sato (animation director) (born 1959)